Wauchope Forest is a forest on the Rule Water, in the Scottish Borders area of Scotland, south of Hawick, and including the A6088, the A68 and the B6357, as well as Newcastleton, Bonchester Bridge, Hobkirk, Southdean, Hyndlee, Carter Bar, Abbotrule, Chesters, Scottish Borders.

See also
List of places in the Scottish Borders
List of places in Scotland
List of places in Northumberland

External links
Forestry Commission Scotland, Renewables
Partnership for Renewables working with  Forestry Commission
Oxford Journals / Forestry in the Borders
GEOGRAPH image of Wauchope Forest
Streetmap of Wauchope Forest
Robert Burns: To Mrs. Scott of Wauchope

Forests and woodlands of Scotland